Łódź is a city in central Poland.

Łódź may also refer to:
Łódź (European Parliament constituency)
Łódź Voivodeship
Łódź, Gostyń County in Greater Poland Voivodeship (west-central Poland)
Łódź, Poznań County in Greater Poland Voivodeship (west-central Poland)